David Fanning (born 1955) is a professor of music at the University of Manchester.  He is an expert on the music of Dmitri Shostakovich, Carl Nielsen and Soviet music. He is the author and editor of a number of books, collaborating with wife, Michelle Assay, on a book about Mieczysław Weinberg.
He is also the editor of the journal Carl Nielsen Studies.

As well as being a musicologist, he is also the pianist with the Danel Quartet and a reviewer for The Daily Telegraph, Gramophone and BBC Radio 3.

Major publications
 The Breath of the Symphonist: Shostakovich's Tenth (London, 1988) 
 Expressionism Reassessed, ed. (Manchester, 1994)
 Shostakovich Studies, ed. (Cambridge, 1995)  
 Nielsen Symphony No. 5 (Cambridge, 1997) 
 Nielsen Aladdin - critical edition (Copenhagen, 2000)
 Shostakovich: String Quartet No. 8 (Aldershot, 2004) 
 Nielsen Piano Works - critical edition (Copenhagen, 2006)
 The Cambridge Companion to Shostakovich (Cambridge, 2008) 
 Mieczyslaw Weinberg: In search of freedom (Hofheim, 2010) 
 Carl Nielsen: Selected Letters and Diaries (Copenhagen, 2017)

References

English musicologists
English classical pianists
Male classical pianists
Place of birth missing (living people)
Living people
Academics of the University of Manchester
1955 births
21st-century classical pianists
21st-century British male musicians